Zerdana is an Iranian endemic and monotypic genus in family Brassicaceae with the single species of Zerdana anchonioides.  A caespitose perennial species growing in mountainous areas on stony and rocky slopes at an altitude of 3000 - 4000m in Irano-Turanian region.

The generic name has been taken from Zard Kuh (Yellow Mountain) in Zagros range, West Iran.

References

Brassicaceae
Monotypic Brassicaceae genera
Endemic flora of Iran